Labyrinth is the set of sculptures and ceramics created by the Catalan artist Joan Miró for Marguerite Aimé Maeght, between 1961 and 1981. It is currently located at the Maeght Foundation in Saint Paul de Vence, France.

Labyrinth consists of 250 works, mainly sculptures, scattered in a garden with terraces overlooking the sea, which illustrate the story of the connection between the Maeght family and Joan Miró. The labyrinth is a walk through the mind and imagination of the artist.

History 
In the early 1960s, Joan Miró took an active part in Aimé Maeght's project in Saint-Paul-de-Vence near Nice. Maeght visited the artist in Cala Major (Majorca), and entrusted Josep Lluís Sert — the architect who designed Barcelona's Fundació Joan Miró — with building a museum  and a garden with space for artworks by Miró. Miró designed the garden as a labyrinth. He worked with Josep Artigas and Joan Gardy Artigas to create the ceramic artworks for the garden, and with Sert to design the building and surrounding space. Miró prepared several mockups of the artworks, which were finally built in marble, concrete, iron, bronze, and ceramics. These include La fourche ("The Fork", built in bronze in 1973) and Le Disque ("The Disk", built in ceramics that same year).

Description 
The labyrinth, which Miró conceived as a maze, is a garden between the mountains and the sea. It is organised along three axis: the highest terrace, dominated by a massive concrete arch; a fork on the head of a person suspended in the air overlooking the walkway; and a masonry tower with a ceramic wall made by the artist. The labyrinth can be traversed in any direction, and an hommage to Antoni Gaudí can be found (a round grey ceramic table reminiscent of Barcelona's Park Güell).

The sculptures include the Solar bird and the Lunar Bird, which neighbour the figure of a giant goddess whose genitalia are covered with the shell of a giant tortoise. There is also a giant egg, the giant cosmic egg:

References

Bibliography

External links 
 Fondation Maeght website — location of the Labyrinth.

Sculptures by Joan Miró
Sculpture gardens, trails and parks in France
Buildings and structures in Alpes-Maritimes